Solenanthus is a genus of flowering plants in the family Boraginaceae.

Species include:
 Solenanthus albanicus, (Degen & Bald.) Degen & Bald.
 Solenanthus apenninus, (L.) Fisch. & C.A.Mey.
 Solenanthus biebersteinii, DC.
 Solenanthus circinnatus, Ledeb.
 Solenanthus formosus, R.R.Mill
 Solenanthus hupehensis, R.R.Mill
 Solenanthus lanatus, (L.) A.DC.
 Solenanthus minimus, Brand
 Solenanthus pindicus, Aldén
 Solenanthus reverchonii, Degen
 Solenanthus scardicus, Bornm.
 Solenanthus stamineus, (Desf.)Wettst
 Solenanthus turkestanicus, (Regel & Smirnov) Kusn.

 
Taxonomy articles created by Polbot
Boraginaceae genera